The Penrose method (or square-root method) is a method devised in 1946 by Professor Lionel Penrose for allocating the voting weights of delegations (possibly a single representative) in decision-making bodies proportional to the square root of the population represented by this delegation. This is justified by the fact that, due to the square root law of Penrose, the a priori voting power (as defined by the Penrose–Banzhaf index) of a member of a voting body is inversely proportional to the square root of its size. Under certain conditions, this allocation achieves equal voting powers for all people represented, independent of the size of their constituency. Proportional allocation would result in excessive voting powers for the electorates of larger constituencies.

A precondition for the appropriateness of the method is en bloc voting of the delegations in the decision-making body: a delegation cannot split its votes; rather, each delegation has just a single vote to which weights are applied proportional to the square root of the population they represent. Another precondition is that the opinions of the people represented are statistically independent. The representativity of each delegation results from statistical fluctuations within the country, and then, according to Penrose, "small electorate are likely to obtain more representative governments than large electorates." A mathematical formulation of this idea results in the square root rule.

The Penrose method is not currently being used for any notable decision-making body, but it has been proposed for apportioning representation in a United Nations Parliamentary Assembly, and for voting in the Council of the European Union.

The EU proposal

The Penrose method became revitalised within the European Union when it was proposed by Sweden in 2003 amid negotiations on the Amsterdam Treaty and by Poland June 2007 during summit on the Treaty of Lisbon. In this context, the method was proposed to compute voting weights of member states in the Council of the European Union.

Currently, the voting in the Council of the EU does not follow the Penrose method. Instead, the rules of the Nice Treaty are effective between 2004 and 2014, under certain conditions until 2017. The associated voting weights are compared in the adjacent table along with the population data of the member states.

Besides the voting weight, the voting power (i.e., the Penrose–Banzhaf index) of a member state also depends on the threshold percentage needed to make a decision. Smaller percentages work in favor of larger states. For example, if one state has 30% of the total voting weights while the threshold for decision making is at 29%, this state will have 100% voting power (i.e., an index of 1). For the EU-27, an optimal threshold, at which the voting powers of all citizens in any member state are almost equal, has been computed at about 61.6%. After the university of the authors of this paper, this system is referred to as the "Jagiellonian Compromise". Optimal threshold decreases with the number  

The UN proposal
According to INFUSA, "The square-root method is more than a pragmatic compromise between the extreme methods of world representation unrelated to population size and allocation of national quotas in direct proportion to population size; Penrose showed that in terms of statistical theory the square-root method gives to each voter in the world an equal influence on decision-making in a world assembly".

Under the Penrose method, the relative voting weights of the most populous countries are lower than their proportion of the world population. In the table below, the countries' voting weights are computed as the square root of their year-2005 population in millions. This procedure was originally published by Penrose in 1946 based on pre-World War II population figures.

Criticisms
It has been claimed that the Penrose method is restricted to votes for which public opinion is equally divided for and against. A study of various elections has shown that this equally-divided scenario is not typical; these elections suggested that voting weights should be distributed according to the 0.9 power of the number of voters represented (in contrast to the 0.5 power used in the Penrose method).

In practice, the theoretical possibility of the decisiveness of a single vote is questionable. Elections results that come close to a tie are likely to be legally challenged, as was the case in the US presidential election in Florida in 2000, which suggests that no single vote is pivotal.

In addition, a minor technical issue is that the theoretical argument for allocation of voting weight is based on the possibility that an individual has a deciding vote in each representative's area. This scenario is only possible when each representative has an odd number of voters in their area.

See also

 List of countries by population

References

External links
The Double Majority Voting Rule of the EU Reform Treaty as a Democratic Ideal for an Enlarging Union : an Appraisal Using Voting Power Analysis, D. Leech and H. Aziz, University of Warwick (2007).
Many more references at the web page of American Mathematical Society here.

Electoral systems